Waldemar Hoven (10 February 1903 – 2 June 1948) was a Nazi and a physician at Buchenwald concentration camp.

Hoven was born in Freiburg, Baden, Germany. Between 1919 and 1921, Hoven visited Denmark and Sweden to study agriculture. In the 1920s, he visited the United States, where he worked as a movie extra in Hollywood. In the 1930s, Hoven went to Paris, where he had an affair with an American woman who gave him an extremely valuable gold cigarette case. Hoven finally returned home to Freiburg in 1933, where he completed his high school studies. He then attended the Universities of Freiburg and Munich. In 1934, he joined the SS. In 1939, he concluded his medical studies and became a physician for the SS. Hoven rose to the rank of Hauptsturmführer (Captain) in the Waffen SS.

Hoven was involved in the administration of medical experiments regarding typhus and the tolerance of serum containing phenol, and which led to the deaths of many inmates. He was also involved in the Aktion T4 programs, during which people with disabilities were killed, along with Jewish people who were considered unfit for work. According to other prisoners, Hoven was murdering 90 to 100 prisoners every week, for a year and a half, with phenol injections.

He was arrested by the Nazis on 12 September 1943, accused of giving a lethal injection of phenol to Hauptscharführer Rudolph Köhler, an SS officer who was a potential witness in an investigation against Ilse Koch, with whom Hoven was rumoured to be having an affair. Hoven was charged with murder, but the case was delayed. He was released on 15 March 1945 due to the shortage of doctors.

Trial 
Hoven was arrested at the end of World War II by the Allies and put on trial as a defendant at the Doctors' Trial, one of the Nuremberg Trials.  He was found guilty of war crimes, crimes against humanity and membership in a criminal organization.  He was sentenced to death and hanged on 2 June 1948 at Landsberg Prison in Bavaria.

External links 
"U.S. Military Tribunal No. 1, Case No. 1: Closing Brief for the United States of America Against Waldemar Hoven", 16 June 1947. Harvard Law School Nuremberg Trials Project.

References 

 

1903 births
1948 deaths
Aktion T4 personnel
Buchenwald concentration camp personnel
Executed Nazi concentration camp personnel
Executions by the United States Nuremberg Military Tribunals
German military doctors
German people convicted of crimes against humanity
Holocaust perpetrators in Germany
Nazi human subject research
Physicians in the Nazi Party
Executed people from Baden-Württemberg
SS-Hauptsturmführer
Physicians from Freiburg im Breisgau
People from the Grand Duchy of Baden
Prisoners and detainees of Germany
Waffen-SS personnel
Executed mass murderers